Stamford station, officially known as the Stewart B. McKinney Transportation Center or the Stamford Transportation Center, is a major railroad station in the city of Stamford, Connecticut, serving passengers traveling on Metro-North Railroad's New Haven Line, Amtrak's Northeast Corridor, and CTrail's Shore Line East. In addition, it is also a major bus terminal for Greyhound, Peter Pan, and CTtransit buses. Annual ridership on Metro-North exceeded 8.4 million in 2016, making it the second busiest station in the entire system, after Grand Central Terminal.

The split for the New Canaan Branch is just northeast of the station. A few Shore Line East trains terminate at Stamford during the morning rush hour, and originate there in the evening, though this service was suspended indefinitely on March 16, 2020, due to the coronavirus pandemic.

United Airlines codeshares with Amtrak to provide service out of Stamford station to the train station at United's Northeast hub, Newark Liberty International Airport. As such, the train station has the IATA airport code (as an IATA-indexed train station) ZTF.

Downtown Stamford is directly north of the station; the entrance to the station on the north side is marked by the Stamford Cone, a work of public sculpture situated at the top of Gateway Commons, while the South End is located directly south.

History

Regular daily train service began in Stamford on January 1, 1849. In 1867, a depot was built one block east of the present location. The railroad at that time consisted of two tracks and passed through town on ground level (crossing the streets at grade). In the mid-1890s two more tracks were added to the line and most crossings were elevated and bridged, so the 1867 depot, was razed and replaced.

Architecture critic Paul Goldberger, writing for The New York Times in 1987, criticized the station for "a harshness almost unequaled in contemporary architecture" as well as for cost overruns and many functional failings, including the lack of shelter for the track platforms. The route from the cross-tracks waiting room to the platform was so long and indirect that passengers who waited indoors until a train's arrival was announced could not get to the platform in time to board it.

A complete renovation of the station in the early 2000s, provided for in the original design of the overhead structure, addressed these problems. The two platforms were made island platforms, capable of serving four tracks. Added features included platform canopies, stairs and escalators directly from the waiting room for the tracks, and a new platform crossover, connecting to the parking garage.

Construction of a new 928-space parking garage began in October 2021. It is expected to open in mid-2023.

Station layout
The station has a 9-car-long side platform on the south side, a 10-car-long platform on the north side and two high-level 12-car-long island platforms. The main station concourse straddles the tracks of the Northeast Corridor, and contains the ticket booth, a passenger waiting area, and shops. Below the platform level is an MTA police station, other shops, a Greyhound/Peter Pan office and CT Transit Customer Information Center. Stairs and escalators lead to the platform level. On the south side of the station, across an access street, is a large parking garage connected to the concourse by one pedestrian bridge and directly connected to the east end of the platforms by a second bridge (both bridges connect to Level 4 of the garage).

A bus station is located just to the north of the train station, underneath a large bridge carrying Interstate 95. Taxis pick up passengers at a stand on the south side of the station. A car rental agency is located southwest of the station building.

Parking

Multiple parking garages are within the area, including a garage that is open 24/7 and is linked by air-bridge to the upper level of the train station.

In 2012 it was announced by the Connecticut Dept of Transportation that the old parking garage would be demolished. An RFP was issued State requests railroad garage plans seeking developers' ideas for what to construct on the site of the old garage with the possibility that replacement parking (for 1000 spaces) would be moved to a quarter mile from the rail station.

Harbor Point Gateway Garage, at the intersection of Washington Boulevard and West Henry Street, provides indoor parking near the station. The facility includes an electric vehicle charging station as well as a car wash/detail service. A pedestrian bridge over Washington Boulevard provides direct access to the train platform from the garage.

Ridership
The number of people taking Metro-North to Stamford doubled from 2,155 in 1996 to 4,226 in 2006. In recent years, additional office space has been built near the train station to allow commuters to avoid Interstate 95, which is typically very congested during rush hour. For example, The Royal Bank of Scotland completed a $400 million office building in 2008 within 200 yards of the station.

Stamford is the busiest Metro-North Railroad station outside of New York City, with the only busier station being Grand Central Terminal. As of 2016, average weekday commuter ridership for the center was 30,000 passengers, ranking among the busiest in the metropolitan area.

The station, along with the Greenwich railroad station, is receiving increasing numbers of reverse commuters who work in Stamford but live in New York City. Reverse commuting has doubled from 1997 to 2007 and increased 150 percent since 1990, with 1,900 reverse commuters as of 2007. Younger employees, often single and with enough money to live in Manhattan, for instance, sometimes prefer to live there, although more housing and nightlife have come to Downtown Stamford in recent years. Metro-North has added trains and express service to serve these commuters. As financial companies move to Stamford from Manhattan, some employees often become reverse commuters. Larger companies that are farther away than a few minutes walk from the station routinely provide shuttle service for their workers.

Services

Stamford receives very frequent rail service on the New Haven Line. During peak hours, trains at Stamford come in intervals as little as three or seven minutes apart. Reverse commute trains during rush hours also operate relatively frequently, at intervals of ten to twenty minutes. Off-peak trains in both directions arrive at Stamford every thirty to forty minutes, but usually within a half-hour of each other.

The station divides the New Haven Line into an outer zone and an inner zone. Outer zone trains usually run local from New Haven to Stamford, then run express to Grand Central, normally stopping only at Harlem-125th Street. Inner zone trains usually originate here and run local all the way to Grand Central. Passengers transferring between zones can make cross-platform interchanges in Stamford.

As of 2014, Stamford has been a central stop for a special "Yankee Clipper" Train. The trains are timed to arrive between 45 minutes and 2 hours prior to the start of the game, and depart between 20 and 45 minutes after they end.

Due to ridership growth in recent years, ConnDOT announced on March 19, 2007 that it would extend more Shore Line East trains to Stamford during peak hours. To coincide with the extension of this service, Metro-North added another five trains on the New Haven Line to cope with the increases in passenger demand at Stamford.

Amtrak also runs three routes which stop at Stamford: the Acela Express, the only high-speed rail service in the United States, the Northeast Regional, providing local service along the Northeast Corridor, on which Stamford is a vital station, and the Vermonter, the only train from Connecticut that goes to Vermont. Stamford is now the second-busiest Amtrak station in Connecticut, after New Haven's Union Station.

References

External links 

 Washington Boulevard entrance from Google Maps Street View
 Entrance south of tracks from Google Maps Street View
 Station Building on State Street from Google Maps Street View
Stamford Amtrak-Metro North-Shore Line East Station (USA Rail Guide - Train Web)

Metro-North Railroad stations in Connecticut
Stations on the Northeast Corridor
Amtrak stations in Connecticut
Shore Line East stations
Transportation in Stamford, Connecticut
Buildings and structures in Stamford, Connecticut
Railroad stations in Fairfield County, Connecticut
Stations along New York, New Haven and Hartford Railroad lines
Historic American Engineering Record in Connecticut
Railway stations in the United States opened in 1848
1848 establishments in Connecticut